Luigi Bortoluzzi (born 7 March 1961) is a former Italian male mountain runner, who won two medals at individual senior level  at the World Mountain Running Championships.

See also
 Italy at the World Mountain Running Championships

References

External links
 

1961 births
Living people
Italian male mountain runners
20th-century Italian people